WWOR EMI Service was a New York City-based American cable television channel that operated as a superstation feed of Secaucus, New Jersey-licensed WWOR-TV (channel 9). The service was uplinked to satellite from Syracuse, New York by Eastern Microwave, Inc., which later sold the satellite distribution rights to the Advance Entertainment Corporation subsidiary of Advance Publications, a Syracuse-based company that also owned various print, broadcast, and cable television properties.

In the New York metropolitan area, the superstation feed was not carried on local cable providers, but was available to satellite subscribers. Two exceptions to this took place, once on February 26, 1993 after the World Trade Center bombing, when the local WWOR's transmitter was knocked out for the day. Cable providers in the New York metro area used the superstation feed as a substitute until the transmitter returned to service. The other was on Long Beach Island in Ocean County, New Jersey. Although that area falls within the New York City market, the Comcast system serving that area carried WWOR EMI Service instead of the local feed, as they were unable to obtain a microwave link to be able to carry channel 9. Months after the end of the feed, that system began carrying the local feed, which by that point was uplinked to satellite.

History

1965 to January 1990
In 1965, Eastern Microwave began relaying the signal of WOR-TV (channel 9) in New York City via microwave to cable providers located in markets immediately surrounding the New York City metropolitan area, reaching as far west as Buffalo, New York and as far south as Delaware, as well as throughout New England. In April 1979, Eastern began to uplink the signal for satellite and cable subscribers throughout the United States, joining WGN-TV in Chicago and WTBS (now WPCH-TV) in Atlanta as a national superstation. For the eleven years that followed, cable viewers throughout the United States saw the same exact signal that the New York City market saw.

Arrival of SyndEx
In 1989, the Federal Communications Commission (FCC) passed the "Syndication Exclusivity Rights rule" (or "SyndEx") into law. This law meant that whenever a local television station had the exclusive rights to broadcast a syndicated program, that particular program must be blacked out on any out-of-market stations that were carried by local cable providers. After the law was passed, EMI purchased the rights to programs that no stations had claimed exclusive rights to, and launched a special national feed for cable and satellite subscribers outside of the New York City market on January 1, 1990, called the "WWOR EMI Service". Most of the syndicated programs that WWOR-TV had the rights to show in the New York City market were covered up by the alternate programming shown on the national feed—with the exception of most sporting events, local newscasts and other WWOR-produced programming such as Steampipe Alley, The Joe Franklin Show, the overnight Shop at Home program, the annual Weekend with the Stars Telethon for United Cerebral Palsy, the annual Jerry Lewis MDA Labor Day Telethon for the Muscular Dystrophy Association, and a select number of programs that were not claimed as exclusive to any market. Most of the programs came from the libraries of Universal Television (whose parent company, MCA Inc., owned WWOR-TV at the time of the EMI Service's founding), MGM Television and Quinn Martin, along with some shows from the Christian Science Monitors television service, as well as some holdover shows that had aired on the local New York feed before the SyndEx law's passage. This caused confusion among WWOR's cable viewers outside of the New York metropolitan area, as promotions during time periods in which the national feed was simulcasting WWOR's New York signal were left unaltered, leaving in promos for shows that were not airing on the national feed due to the SyndEx law.

When channel 9 became a UPN affiliate in 1995, the WWOR EMI Service also covered up the network's shows, due to Paramount (although the network's sole owner-turned-half owner Chris-Craft owned the station) using syndication exclusivity to keep UPN's shows off the national WWOR feed—in contrast, rival superstation WGN carried programming from The WB Television Network on its national feed until nationwide coverage (by terrestrial and local cable means) was deemed sufficient to discontinue its carriage over the national WGN feed in October 1999. As a result of the syndication exclusivity claims by UPN, if New York City viewers of WWOR saw Star Trek: Voyager, cable viewers throughout the rest of the country saw Hazel reruns in the same timeslot.

In mid-1996, EMI sold the satellite distribution rights to WWOR and Boston's WSBK-TV to Advance Entertainment Corporation. On December 31, 1996, AEC discontinued the feed, selling WWOR's former satellite transponder slot to Discovery Communications for the then six-month-old Animal Planet, which Advance still presently owns in part.

Reversion to New York feed
Due to outcry from satellite dish owners who missed WWOR, the station was uplinked to satellite once again on a different transponder by National Programming Service, LLC less than a week after AEC's discontinuation of the WWOR national feed. The national feed was once again the same feed that New York City area viewers saw, with all of the syndicated and UPN programs intact, due to the station now only being distributed outside of New York to satellite dish owners. Occasionally local cable providers picked up this feed to relay UPN to customers in markets where the network was unavailable, or in the case of several Sinclair Broadcast Group stations, was dropped and replaced with The WB. This feed was discontinued in 1999 in favor of distributing the national feed of Pax TV, but Dish Network (who previously carried the EMI feed from the provider's launch in mid-1996, until the feed was shut down at the end of that year) still carries the New York feed of WWOR on both the provider's local station package in the New York market and its superstation package across the rest of the country, except in markets where a local MyNetworkTV affiliate uses the SyndEx law to black out WWOR's programming from being available within the market.

See also
 WWOR-TV, the local version

References

1979 establishments in New York (state)
1997 disestablishments in New York (state)
Defunct television networks in the United States
Superstations in the United States
Television channels and stations established in 1979
Television channels and stations disestablished in 1997
English-language television stations in the United States
Advance Publications
Television stations in New Jersey
Defunct companies based in Syracuse, New York